Hopkinton Green Historic District is a national historic district located at Hopkinton, St. Lawrence County, New York.  The district encompasses two contributing buildings and one contributing site in the town of Hopkinton.  The district is centered on the village green and include representative examples of Italianate and Shingle Style architecture.  Contributing resources are the Hopkinton Green (1808), Town Hall (1870), and Congregational Church (1892).

It was listed on the National Register of Historic Places in 2013.

Gallery

References

Historic districts on the National Register of Historic Places in New York (state)
Italianate architecture in New York (state)
Buildings and structures in St. Lawrence County, New York
National Register of Historic Places in St. Lawrence County, New York
1808 establishments in New York (state)